is a Brazilian kickboxer of Japanese and Italian descent, fighting out of Fighting Kairos Gym. He is the former K-1 Super Welterweight champion.

He has faced several notable fighters of his weight division such as Kaew Fairtex, Hideaki Yamazaki, Yasuomi Soda, Masaaki Noiri, Massaro Glunder and Hiroya.

He was ranked in the featherweight top ten by Combat Press between June 2015 and March 2017. He was also ranked in the top ten by Liverkick.com.

Kickboxing

Krush title run
He began his kickboxing career fight under the banner of MA Japan. He amassed an 8-2-1 record with them, with six of his wins coming by KO. He capped off his time with MA Japan by winning the MA Japan Super Lightweight Championship.

In his Krush debut, Kimura fought NOMAN. He beat him by KO in the first round. In his second fight with Krush, he KO'd Daizo Sasaki in the first round. In his third fight with Krush, he TKO'd Ryuji Kajiwara in the third round.

Following his three fight winning streak, Kimura fought Yuji Takeuchi in a 63 kg title eliminator. He won by a first round KO.

Minoru fought the reigning Krush Lightweight champion Hideaki Yamazaki during Krush 35. Yamazaki won by KO, just 47 seconds into the fight.

K-1 Super Lightweight title run
Kimura rebounded from his failed title bid with a TKO win over Daizo Sasaki during Krush 39. In his next fight he faced the forme Krush and ISKA champion Thomas Adamandopoulos, whom he beat by a second round TKO.

Kimura took part in the 2014 K-1 Super Lightweight Grand Prix. He lost to Yasuomi Soda in the quarter finals.

Kimura was scheduled to fight the 2014 K-1 Welterweight Grand Prix winner Kaew Fairtex in January 2015. Kimura won by majority decision. He beat Hiroya by a first round TKO. He beat Massaro Glunder by decision, after an extra fought round was fought. He was scheduled to fight Ren Hiramoto during K-1's 2015 Survival Wars. He won the fight by unanimous decision.

His four fight winning streak earned him a chance to fight for the K-1 Super Lightweight title in a rematch with Kaew Fairtex in November 2015. Fairtex won by KO in the first round.

Winning the Krush title
Following his failed title, Kimura traded wins and losses over his next five fights. The first loss was to Masaaki Noiri in the K-1 Welterweight Grand Prix quarter finals. Noiri beat him by KO in the first round. He beat NOMAN by a unanimous decision in June 2016. He lost to Kohei Nishikawa by KO during Krush 74. He beat Kenji during Krush 76 by a first round TKO.

He took part in the 2017 K-1 Welterweight Grand Prix, and faced Yuta Kubo in the quarter finals. Kimura lost a unanimous decision.

Minoru was scheduled to fight Yasuhiro Kido in November 2017. He won the fight by unanimous decision to begin a four fight winning streak. Kimura fought Jin Hirayama during K'Festa 1, and won the fight by a first round KO. He fought Kazuki Yamagiwa in June 2018, and won the fight by a first round left hook KO.

Kimura fought Hitoshi Tsukakoshi, during Krush 91, for the Krush Welterweight title. He won the fight by TKO, after knocking Tsukakoshi down three times in the first round.

Krush title reign
After winning the Krush title, he lost to Jordann Pikeur by TKO, after being knocked down three times inside of the third round. Minoru fought Hiromi Wajima during K'Festa 2. He won the fight by a first round KO.

Kimura's first title defense was against Kaisei Kondo during Krush 101. He beat Kondo in the second round by KO.

Kimura fought Cruz Briggs in June 2019. He beat Briggs by a first round KO. Kimura was scheduled to face Sho Oizumi two months later. He beat Oizumi by a first round KO. Minoru faced Jordan Valdinocci at K-1's 2019 Yokohamatsuri event. Valdinocci came into the fight as a late replacement. He won the fight in the second round, by a body shot KO. He fought Marcel Adeyemi in December 2019. He beat Adeyemi by a first round KO.

K-1 Title reign
Kimura participated in K-1's 2020 Super Welterweight tournament. He won the quarterfinal bout against Kaito by a first round KO. He defeated Eder Lopes in the semifinals by first round KO as well. In the tournament finals he faced Hiromi Wajima, whom he likewise beat by a first round KO.

He was scheduled to fight the HEAT Kick Middleweight champion Abiral Ghimire during K-1 World GP 2020 in Tokyo in a non-title bout. He won the fight by TKO in the second round, after the ringside doctor stopped the fight, due to a cut above Abiral's left eye.

Kimura was scheduled to make his first K-1 Welterweight title defense against Hiromi Wajima, whom he had previously beaten by knockout, at K-1 World GP 2021 in Osaka on December 4, 2021. He lost the fight by a third-round knockout, as he was unable to beat the eight count after suffering a body kick knockdown.

Knock Out
Kimura made his KNOCK OUT promotional debut against the KNOCK OUT RED Super Welterweight champion Kuntap Charoenchai at KNOCK OUT 2023 SUPER BOUT BLAZE on March 5, 2023.

Mixed martial arts
In September 2016, Kimura made his mixed martial arts debut for the Rizin Fighting Federation in Tokyo. He faced Charles Bennett and lost the fight via TKO just seven seconds into the first round.

Titles and accomplishments
K-1
 2020 K-1 World GP 2020 -70kg Championship Tournament Winner
 2020 K-1 "Fighter of the Year" Award

Krush
 2018 Krush Welterweight Champion

Martial Arts Japan Kickboxing Federation
 2012 MAJKF Super Lightweight Champion
 2011 MAJKF Rookie Tournament winner

Kickboxing record

|-  style="text-align:center; background:#cfc;"
| 2023-03-05 || Win ||align=left| Kuntap Charoenchai || KNOCK OUT 2023 SUPER BOUT BLAZE  || Tokyo, Japan || KO (Left hook) || 1 || 0:32
|-  style="text-align:center; background:#fbb"
| 2021-12-04 || Loss|| align=left| Hiromi Wajima || K-1 World GP 2021 in Osaka || Osaka, Japan || KO (Body kick) || 3 ||2:50
|-
! style=background:white colspan=9 |
|-  style="background:#cfc;"
| 2020-12-13|| Win ||align=left| Abiral Himalayan Cheetah || K-1 World GP 2020 Winter's Crucial Bout || Tokyo, Japan || TKO (Doctor stoppage)|| 2|| 2:50
|-  style="background:#cfc;"
| 2020-03-22||Win ||align=left| Hiromi Wajima|| K-1: K’Festa 3, -70kg Tournament Final|| Saitama, Japan || TKO (Corner stoppage)|| 1|| 1:10
|-
! style=background:white colspan=9 |
|-  style="background:#cfc;"
| 2020-03-22||Win ||align=left| Eder Lopes|| K-1: K’Festa 3, -70kg Tournament Semi Finals || Saitama, Japan || KO (Right cross)|| 1|| 1:02
|-  style="background:#cfc;"
| 2020-03-22||Win ||align=left| Kaito || K-1: K’Festa 3, -70kg Tournament Quarter Finals || Saitama, Japan || KO (Punches)|| 1|| 2:10
|- style="background:#CCFFCC;"
| 2019-12-28|| Win||align=left| Marcel Adeyemi || K-1 World GP 2019 Japan: ～Women's Flyweight Championship Tournament～ || Nagoya, Japan ||KO (Punches) || 1|| 1:18 
|-  style="background:#cfc;"
| 2019-11-24 || Win|| align=left| Jordan Valdinocci || K-1 World GP 2019 Yokohamatsuri || Yokohama, Japan ||KO (Body Punches) || 2|| 2:28 
|-
|- style="background:#CCFFCC;"
| 2019-08-24|| Win ||align=left| Sho Oizumi || K-1 World GP 2019: Japan vs World 5 vs 5 & Special Superfight in Osaka || Osaka, Japan || KO (Punches)|| 1 || 2:17
|-  style="background:#cfc;"
| 2019-06-30|| Win ||align=left| Cruz Briggs || K-1 World GP 2019: Super Bantamweight World Tournament || Saitama, Japan || KO (Right overhand) || 1 || 1:37
|-  bgcolor="#CCFFCC"
| 2019-05-18|| Win||align=left| Kaisei Kondo || Krush 101 || Tokyo, Japan || TKO (Body punches) || 2 || 1:43
|-
! style=background:white colspan=9 |
|-
|-  bgcolor="#CCFFCC"
| 2019-03-10|| Win||align=left| Hiromi Wajima || K-1 World GP 2019: K’FESTA 2 || Saitama, Japan || KO (Left Hook) || 1 || 2:20
|- 
|-  style="background:#Fbb;"
| 2018-11-03 || Loss || align=left| Jordann Pikeur || K-1 World GP 2018: 3rd Super Lightweight Championship Tournament || Saitama Prefecture, Japan || KO (4 knockdowns) || 3 || 1:30
|-  bgcolor="#CCFFCC"
| 2018-08-05 || Win || align=left| Hitoshi Tsukakoshi|| Krush 91 ||  Japan || TKO (3 Knockdowns) || 1 || 1:44
|-
! style=background:white colspan=9 |
|-  bgcolor="#CCFFCC"
| 2018-06-17 || Win || align=left| Kazuki Yamagiwa|| K-1 World GP 2018: 2nd Featherweight Championship Tournament || Saitama, Japan || KO (Left Hook) || 1 || 2:48
|-  bgcolor="#CCFFCC"
| 2018-03-21 || Win || align=left| Jin Hirayama|| K-1 World GP 2018: K'FESTA.1 || Saitama, Japan || KO (Right Hook) || 1 || 2:50
|-  bgcolor="#CCFFCC"
| 2017-11-23|| Win||align=left| Yasuhiro Kido|| K-1 World GP 2017 Heavyweight Championship Tournament, Superfight || Japan || Decision (Unanimous) || 3 || 3:00
|-  style="background:#Fbb;"
| 2017-09-18|| Loss||align=left| Yuta Kubo ||K-1 World GP 2016 -67.5kg World Tournament, Quarter Finals|| Tokyo, Japan || Decision (unanimous) || 3 || 3:00
|-  bgcolor="#CCFFCC"
| 2017-05-28|| Win||align=left| Kenji || Krush 76 || Tokyo, Japan || TKO (3 Knockdowns) || 1 || 1:16
|-  style="background:#Fbb;"
| 2017-03-03 || Loss||align=left| Kohei Nishikawa || Krush 74 || Tokyo, Japan || KO (Right Hook) || 1 || 2:15
|-  bgcolor="#CCFFCC"
| 2016-06-24|| Win||align=left| NOMAN ||K-1 World GP 2016 -65kg World Tournament, Reserve Fight || Tokyo, Japan|| Decision (unanimous) || 3 || 3:00
|-  style="background:#Fbb;"
| 2016-03-04 || Loss||align=left| Masaaki Noiri || K-1 World GP 2016 -65kg Japan Tournament, Quarter Finals || Tokyo, Japan || KO (Knee to the body) || 1 || 2:54
|-  style="background:#Fbb;"
| 2015-11-21 || Loss|| align=left| Kaew Fairtex || K-1 World GP 2015 The Championship || Tokyo, Japan || KO (Punches) || 1 || 2:55
|-
! style=background:white colspan=9 |
|-  bgcolor="#CCFFCC"
| 2015-09-22|| Win||align=left| Ren Hiramoto ||K-1 World GP 2015 Survival Wars || Tokyo, Japan|| Decision (unanimous) || 3 || 3:00
|-  bgcolor="#CCFFCC"
| 2015-07-04|| Win||align=left| Massaro Glunder || K-1 World GP 2015 -70kg Championship Tournament || Tokyo, Japan|| Ext.R Decision (unanimous) || 4 || 3:00
|-  bgcolor="#CCFFCC"
| 2015-04-19|| Win|| align=left| Hiroya || K-1 World GP 2015 -55kg Championship Tournament || Tokyo, Japan || TKO (3 Knockdowns) || 1 || 2:45
|-  bgcolor="#CCFFCC"
| 2015-01-18 || Win|| align=left| Kaew Fairtex|| K-1 World GP 2015 -60kg Championship Tournament || Shibuya, Tokyo, Japan || Decision (Majority) || 3 || 3:00
|-  style="background:#Fbb;"
| 2014-11-03 || Loss|| align=left| Yasuomi Soda || K-1 World GP 2014 -65kg Championship Tournament, Quarter Finals || Shibuya, Tokyo, Japan || TKO (2 Knockdowns) || 2 || 2:43
|-  bgcolor="#CCFFCC"
| 2014-08-24 || Win|| align=left| Tomihira Yoshihito|| Krush 45 in NAGOYA|| Nagoya, Japan || KO (Right Cross) || 2 || 2:23
|-  bgcolor="#CCFFCC"
| 2014-06-12 || Win|| align=left| Thomas Adamandopoulos|| Krush 42|| Tokyo, Japan || TKO (3 Knockdowns) || 2 || 2:55
|-  bgcolor="#CCFFCC"
| 2014-03-08|| Win|| align=left| Daizo Sasaki || Krush 39|| Tokyo, Japan || TKO (3 Knockdowns) || 1 || 2:49
|-  style="background:#Fbb;"
| 2013-12-14 || Loss|| align=left| Hideaki Yamazaki || Krush 35 || Tokyo, Japan || KO (Overhand Right) || 1 || 0:47
|-
! style=background:white colspan=9 |
|-  bgcolor="#CCFFCC"
| 2013-09-21|| Win|| align=left| Yuji Takeuchi || Krush 33 - Next Challenger fight|| Tokyo, Japan || KO (Punches) || 1 || 2:07

|-  bgcolor="#CCFFCC"
| 2013-05-12|| Win|| align=left| Ryuji Kajiwara|| Krush 28|| Tokyo, Japan || TKO (Doctor Stoppage) || 3 || 1:50
|-  bgcolor="#CCFFCC"
| 2013-03-03|| Win|| align=left| Daizo Sasaki || Krush-IGNITION 2013 vol.2|| Tokyo, Japan || KO (Punches) || 1 || 2:19
|-  bgcolor="#CCFFCC"
| 2013-01-14|| Win|| align=left| NOMAN|| Krush Grand Prix 2013|| Japan || TKO (Punches) || 1 || 2:29
|-  bgcolor="#CCFFCC"
| 2012-12-09|| Win|| align=left| Hidekazu Tanaka||MAJKF BREAK-32 SEIZE || Japan || KO (Right Hook)|| 4 || 0:39
|-
! style=background:white colspan=9 |
|-  style="background:#Fbb;"
| 2012-09-09 || Loss|| align=left| Hiroto Yamaguchi || Krush YOUTH GP 2012 63 kg First round || Japan || KO (Left Hook) || 2 || 2:01
|-  style="background:#Fbb;"
| 2012-07-15|| Loss|| align=left| Sho Ogawa || MAJKF KICK GUTS 2012 || Japan || Decision (Unanimous) || 3 || 3:00
|-  bgcolor="#CCFFCC"
| 2012-06-03|| Win|| align=left| Kazuma ||MAJKF ~ KICKBOXING Sentokai Samurai 10|| Japan || Decision (Unanimous)|| 3 || 3:00
|-  bgcolor="#CCFFCC"
| 2012-03-18|| Win|| align=left| Wajo||MAJKF BREAK-24 SAGITTARIUS || Japan || TKO (Corner Stoppage)|| 3 || 0:39
|-  bgcolor="#CCFFCC"
| 2011-11-20|| Win|| align=left| Black Dragon||MAJKF BREAK-20 ～RAISE～ - 2011 Rookie tournament final|| Japan || TKO (3 Knockdowns)|| 1 || 2:38
|-
! style=background:white colspan=9 |
|-  bgcolor="#CCFFCC"
| 2011-10-09|| Win|| align=left| Chibita ||MAJKF BREAK-18 Sils - 2011 Rookie tournament semi-finals || Japan || KO|| 1 || 1:35
|-  bgcolor="#CCFFCC"
| 2011-08-28|| Win|| align=left| Kohei Ishigaki || SNKA BRAVE HEARTS 17 || Japan || KO (Punches)|| 1 || 2:25
|-  bgcolor="#CCFFCC"
| 2011-07-18|| Win|| align=left| Kensuke Fujita || MAJKF BREAK-16 ～GRASP～ - 2011 Rookie tournament quarter-finals || Japan || TKO (2 Knockdowns rule)|| 3 || 0:43
|-  bgcolor="#CCFFCC"
| 2011-05-29|| Win|| align=left| Satoru Hashimoto || MAJKF Sentokai Samurai 8 - 2011 Rookie tournament final 16 || Japan || Decision (Unanimous)|| 3 || 3:00
|-  bgcolor="#CCFFCC"
| 2011-02-27|| Win|| align=left| Kazuma || MAJKF BREAK-10 DICE || Japan || KO (2 Knockdowns rules)|| 1 || 0:59
|-  style="background:#c5d2ea"
| 2010-09-20 || Draw ||align=left| Ryusuke Takeoka || MAJKF Sentokai Samurai Budokai 2 || Japan || Decision (Majority)|| 3 || 3:00
|-
| colspan=9 | Legend:    

|-  style="background:#cfc;"
| 2011-08-27|| Win ||align=left| Yusuke Komiyama || K-1 Koshien East Japan Selection, Final|| Tokyo, Japan || Decision (Unanimous)||1 ||
|-  style="background:#cfc;"
| 2011-08-27|| Win ||align=left| Yusuke Ami|| K-1 Koshien East Japan Selection, Semi Final|| Tokyo, Japan || KO||1 ||
|-  style="background:#cfc;"
| 2011-08-27|| Win ||align=left| Haruki Nihei|| K-1 Koshien East Japan Selection, Quarter Final|| Tokyo, Japan || Decision (Unanimous)||1 ||
|-  style="background:#cfc;"
| 2011-08-27|| Win ||align=left| Iyori Akiba|| K-1 Koshien East Japan Selection, Second round|| Tokyo, Japan || Decision (Unanimous)||1 ||
|-  style="background:#cfc;"
| 2011-08-27|| Win ||align=left| Seichi Hokao|| K-1 Koshien East Japan Selection, First round|| Tokyo, Japan || KO|| || 
|-
| colspan=9 | Legend:

Mixed martial arts record

|-
| Loss
| align=center| 0–1
| Charles Bennett
|TKO (punches)
| Rizin World Grand-Prix 2016
| 
| align=center| 1
| align=center| 0:07
|Saitama, Japan
|-

Mixed rules record

|-
|Win
|align=center|1–0
|Yusuke Yachi
|KO (left hook)
|INOKI BOM-BA-YE x Ganryujima
|
|align=center|1
|align=center|1:06
|Tokyo, Japan
|

See also
 List of male kickboxers
 List of K-1 champions

References

Living people
1993 births
Sportspeople from Curitiba
Brazilian male mixed martial artists
Brazilian male kickboxers